Heavy Metal: A Tank Company's Battle to Baghdad is a book by U.S. Army Captain Jason Conroy with Ron Martz published in 2005 by Potomac Books. Conroy and Martz provide personal view of the sometimes-vicious fighting that took place almost from the time the unit crossed the border from Kuwait until it got to Baghdad during the 2003 invasion of Iraq. The book chronicles the making of Charlie Company, following it from its home base at Fort Stewart, Georgia, to training in the deserts of California and Kuwait. It provides details of fighting on the road to Baghdad, including a key battle at the holy city of Najaf, where militias and Fedayeen Saddam used suicide tactics in a fruitless effort to stop the 70-ton M1A1 Abrams tanks.

The book is Conroy's account of what went right and wrong in the invasion. It demonstrates how Conroy and his soldiers were able to overcome supply shortages, intelligence failures, and weather in their battle for downtown Baghdad, a place they were originally told they would never take their tanks. Just south of Baghdad, in the city of Mahmudiyah, Charlie Company engaged in a battle with Soviet-made T-72 tanks at point-blank range, a tactic that is not part of Army doctrine and something for which the young soldiers had not trained for.

The book also reveals how Iraqi Special Republican Guard soldiers used the Iraqi National Museum in Baghdad as a defensive position; the efforts of museum employees and others to hide most of the artifacts before the fighting began; and how the number of items stolen was exaggerated by a member of the museum staff in interviews with international media in an apparent effort to discredit the American military.

Authors
Captain Jason Conroy, a 14-year veteran of the U.S. Army, was the Charlie Company Commander, 1st Battalion, 64th Armor Regiment.

Ron Martz writes on defense issues for the Atlanta Journal-Constitution. He was named writer of the year by the Atlanta Press Club and Cox Newspapers and finished second to the staff of Time Magazine in the National Headliner awards for his coverage of the war in Iraq. He is the co-author of three previous books on military history.

Editions

External links
 Book Photos and Video from Operation Iraqi Freedom
 View Index Google Print

2005 non-fiction books
Iraq War books